Anthony Robert McMillan  (30 March 195014 October 2022), known professionally as Robbie Coltrane, was a Scottish actor and comedian. He gained worldwide recognition in the 2000s for playing Rubeus Hagrid in the Harry Potter film series. He was appointed an OBE in the 2006 New Year Honours by Queen Elizabeth II for his services to drama. In 1990, Coltrane received the Evening Standard British Film AwardPeter Sellers Award for Comedy. In 2011, he was honoured for his "outstanding contribution" to film at the British Academy Scotland Awards.

Coltrane started his career appearing alongside Hugh Laurie, Stephen Fry, and Emma Thompson in the sketch series Alfresco. In 1987, he starred in the BBC miniseries Tutti Frutti with Thompson, for which he received his first British Academy Television Award for Best Actor nomination. Coltrane then gained national prominence starring as criminal psychologist Dr. Eddie "Fitz" Fitzgerald in the ITV television series Cracker, a role which saw him receive the British Academy Television Award for Best Actor in three consecutive years from 1994 to 1996. In 2006, Coltrane came eleventh in ITV's poll of TV's 50 Greatest Stars, voted by the public. In 2016, he starred in the four-part Channel 4 series National Treasure alongside Julie Walters, a role for which he received a British Academy Television Award nomination.

Coltrane appeared in the films Mona Lisa and Nuns on the Run and as Valentin Dmitrovich Zukovsky in the James Bond films GoldenEye and The World Is Not Enough. He also appeared in the films Henry V, Let It Ride, Danny, the Champion of the World, Ocean's Twelve, The Brothers Bloom, Great Expectations, and Effie Gray, and provided voice acting roles in the animated films The Tale of Despereaux and Brave.

Early life and education
Coltrane was born Anthony Robert McMillan on 30 March 1950 in Rutherglen, Scotland, the son of Jean Ross Howie, a teacher and pianist, and Ian Baxter McMillan, a GP who also served as a forensic police surgeon. He had an older sister, Annie, and a younger sister, Jane. Coltrane was the great-grandson of Scottish businessman Thomas W. Howie and the nephew of businessman Forbes Howie.

He started his education at Belmont House School in Newton Mearns before moving to Glenalmond College, an independent school in Perthshire. Though he later described his experiences there as deeply unhappy, he played for the rugby First XV, was head of the school's debating society, and won prizes for his art. He studied painting at the Glasgow School of Art.

Coltrane later called for private schools to be banned and used to be known as "Red Robbie", rebelling against his conservative upbringing through involvement with Amnesty International, Greenpeace, the Labour Party, and the Campaign for Nuclear Disarmament.

Career
Coltrane moved into acting in his early twenties, adopting the stage name Coltrane (in tribute to jazz saxophonist John Coltrane) and working in theatre and comedy. He appeared in the first stage production of John Byrne's The Slab Boys, at the Traverse Theatre in Edinburgh (1978). His comedic abilities brought him roles in The Comic Strip Presents (1982–2012) series (in 1993 he directed and co-wrote the episode "Jealousy" for series 5), as well as the comedy sketch show Alfresco (1983–1984). In 1984 he appeared in A Kick Up the Eighties (Series 2) and Laugh??? I Nearly Paid My Licence Fee, and is credited as a writer for both.Coltrane moved into roles in films such as Flash Gordon (1980), Death Watch (1980), Balham, Gateway to the South (1981), Scrubbers (1983), Krull (1983), The Supergrass (1985), Defence of the Realm (1985), Absolute Beginners (1986), Mona Lisa (1986), and appeared as "Annabelle" in The Fruit Machine (1988).

On television, he appeared in The Young Ones, Tutti Frutti (1987), as Samuel Johnson in Blackadder the Third (1987) (a role he later reprised in the more serious Boswell and Johnson's Tour of the Western Islands (1993)), LWT's The Robbie Coltrane Special (1989, which he also co-wrote), and in other stand-up and sketch comedy shows. He played the part of Falstaff in Kenneth Branagh's Henry V (1989). The same year he starred opposite Jeremy Irons in the television film adaptation of Roald Dahl's children's book Danny, the Champion of the World.

He co-starred with Eric Idle in Nuns on the Run (1990) and played the Pope in The Pope Must Die (1991). He also played a would-be private detective obsessed with Humphrey Bogart in the TV film The Bogie Man (1992). His roles continued in the 1990s with the TV series Cracker (1993–1996, returning in 2006 for a one-off special), in which he starred as forensic psychologist Dr. Edward "Fitz" Fitzgerald. The role won him three BAFTA awards.

Roles in bigger films followed: the James Bond films GoldenEye (1995) and The World Is Not Enough (1999), a supporting role in From Hell (2001), as well as half-giant Rubeus Hagrid in the Harry Potter films (2001–2011). J. K. Rowling, author of the Harry Potter books, had Coltrane at the top of her list to play Hagrid and, when asked whom she would like to see in the role, responded "Robbie Coltrane for Hagrid" in one quick breath.

Coltrane also presented a number of documentary programmes for the British ITV network based around his twin passions for travel and transportation.

In 1997, Coltrane appeared in a series of six programmes under the title Coltrane's Planes and Automobiles, in which he extolled the virtues of the steam engine, the diesel engine, the supercharger, the V8 engine, the two-stroke engine, and the jet engine. In these programmes he dismantled and rebuilt several engines. He also single-handedly removed the engine from a Trabant car in 23 minutes.

In September 2006, Coltrane was voted No. 11 in ITV's TV's 50 Greatest Stars and sixth in a poll of 2000 adults across the UK to find the 'most famous Scot', behind the Loch Ness Monster, Robert Burns, Sean Connery, Robert the Bruce, and William Wallace.

In August 2007, Coltrane presented a series for ITV called B-Road Britain, in which he travelled from London to Glasgow, stopping in towns and villages along the way.

Coltrane voiced characters in several animated films, including The Tale of Despereaux (2008) Pixar's Brave (2012), as well as the title roles of Gooby and The Gruffalo (both 2009).

In 2016, Coltrane starred in National Treasure, a four-part drama in which he played a former comedian accused of historic sexual offences. He was nominated for Best Actor at the 2017 British Academy Television Awards, and won in the category at the Royal Television Society Programme Awards. Maureen Ryan of Variety wrote that "Coltrane does a masterful job of depicting every nuance of the character, whose wicked sense of humor masks a startling, and possibly intentional, lack of self-awareness".

Personal life
Coltrane met Rhona Gemmell, a pilates instructor, in the late 1980s. The couple had two children; son Spencer (b. 1992), and daughter Alice (b. 1998). Coltrane and Gemmell married in 1999, but separated in 2003 and later divorced, however the two remained close.

In February 2005, Coltrane appeared at a Scottish Labour event, in which he said on the question of Scottish independence "It's a very complicated issue. I would think, probably, eventually I would like to see independence but only an independent Labour Scotland", while adding "It would have to be terribly carefully considered. There are all sorts of advantages to being part of the United Kingdom and it would be foolish to throw it away immediately" and "I have no time for the nationalists – all they can do is split the vote for home rule and let the Tories in".

Illness and death 
Coltrane suffered from osteoarthritis in later life. He said he was in "constant pain all day" in 2016, and from 2019 onwards; he used a wheelchair. 

Coltrane died at Forth Valley Royal Hospital in Larbert, Scotland, on 14 October 2022, at the age of 72. He had been ill for two years prior to his death. His death was registered by his ex-wife Rhona Gemmell, the death certificate listed the causes as multiple organ failure complicated by sepsis, a lower respiratory tract infection, and heart block. He had also been diagnosed with obesity and type 2 diabetes.

Acting credits

Film

Television

Theatre

Music video

Awards, honours and legacy 

Honorary awards
 Coltrane won the Evening Standard British Film AwardPeter Sellers Award for Comedy 1990.
 He was awarded the OBE (Officer of the Order of the British Empire) in the 2006 New Year Honours for his services to drama.
 In 2011, he was honoured for his "Outstanding Contribution to Film" at the British Academy Scotland Awards ("BAFTA Scotland Awards").

Legacy 
On 26 December 2022 BBC Four broadcast the tribute programme Robbie Coltrane at the BBC narrated by friend and fellow actor Celia Imrie.  This was followed by the documentary Richard Wilson Remembers... Tutti Frutti and the first two episodes of Tutti Frutti. The remaining four episodes were broadcast again over the subsequent two nights.

Publications
 Coltrane, Robbie; Stuart, Graham (May 1993). Coltrane in a Cadillac. HarperCollins. .
 Coltrane, Robbie (October 1997). Coltrane's Planes & Automobiles. Simon & Schuster. .
 Coltrane, Robbie (June 2008). Robbie Coltrane's B-Road Britain. Transworld. .

References

External links

 
 
 
 

1950 births
2022 deaths
People educated at Belmont House School
20th-century Scottish male actors
21st-century Scottish male actors
Alumni of the Glasgow School of Art
Audiobook narrators
Best Actor BAFTA Award (television) winners
Deaths from multiple organ failure
Officers of the Order of the British Empire
People educated at Glenalmond College
People from Rutherglen
Scottish male comedians
Scottish male film actors
Scottish male television actors
Scottish male voice actors
The Comic Strip
People with type 2 diabetes